Michael Choumnos or Chumnus was a Byzantine jurist and canonist, who was nomophylax, and afterwards Metropolitan of Thessalonica. He lived in the 12th century, and is said to have been the author of various works.

References 
 

12th-century Byzantine writers
Byzantine bishops of Thessalonica
Byzantine officials
12th-century Byzantine bishops
Michael
12th-century jurists
Byzantine jurists